Ermenegildo Costantini (1731 – 1791) was an Italian painter, active in Rome in a late-Baroque style.

Biography
He was a pupil of Marco Benefial. He painted frescoes at the Chapel of the SS Sacramento at Velletri, and at the gallery of the Palazzo Antici in Recanati. He returned to Rome in 1791 after an earthquake at Recanati. He made an altarpiece of with a copy of a San Nicola da Tolentino by Raphael, now in the Pinacoteca Comunale of Città di Castello.

References

1731 births
1791 deaths
18th-century Italian painters
Italian male painters
Umbrian painters
18th-century Italian male artists